United Nations Security Council Resolution 2048 was unanimously adopted on 18 May 2012.

See also 
List of United Nations Security Council Resolutions 2001 to 2100

References

External links
Text of the Resolution at undocs.org

 2048
2012 in Guinea-Bissau
 2048
May 2012 events